General of the police Vladimir Alexandrovich Kolokoltsev (born 11 May 1961 in Nizhniy Lomov in Penza Oblast) is a Russian politician and police officer who was the Moscow Police Commissioner from 2009 to 2012. He has been Russian Minister of Internal Affairs since 21 May 2012.

Biography
Kolokoltsev entered police service in 1982. He started his career in a special unit guarding foreign diplomatic missions in Moscow.

In 1984, he was appointed platoon commander of the separate patrol battalion of the Gagarinskiy district executive committee in Moscow.

He entered the Higher Political College of the Ministry of the Interior of the USSR and studied at the faculty of jurisprudence. He graduated from this college at 1989.

Afterwards he returned to police service in the position of detective of Criminal Investigation Unit of Kuntshevskiy district executive committee in Moscow. Then he was appointed to the position of the deputy chief of police station No. 20 in Moscow, and later the chief of police station No. 8 in Moscow.

In 1992, he was assigned to Criminal Investigation Department of Moscow Police Department HQ on the position of senior detective of the second unit.

At the beginning of 1993, he was appointed to the position of the chief of police station No. 108 in Moscow. Two years later he was appointed to the position of the chief of criminal investigation division in Central District Police Department of Moscow.

In 1997, he started to work in the Ministry of Interior of the Russian Federation and on the position of the chief of regional unit no. 4 of Department on Organized Crime Prevention of the Ministry of Interior of Russia in Moscow. Within two years he was appointed to the position of the chief of Regional Operational Search Bureau of Department on Organized Crime Prevention of the Ministry of Interior of Russia for southeastern administrative region of Moscow.

In 2001, he became the chief of unit No. 3 of Operational Search Bureau of the Ministry of Interior of the Russian Federation for Central Federal Region of Russia. Afterwards he was appointed to the position of the deputy chief of this Operational Search Bureau. In 2007, he was appointed to the position of the chief of Police Department in Orlov region. In April 2009, he became the first deputy chief of Criminal Investigation Department of the Ministry of Interior of the Russian Federation. On 7 September 2009, he was appointed by the decree of the President of the Russian Federation to the position of the Moscow Police Commissioner. In 2010, he was given a special rank of "Militsiya lieutenant-general» by the Presidential decree. After re-attestation in 2011, he was re-appointed by the Presidential decree to the position of the Chief of Moscow Police and was given the rank of police lieutenant-general.

On 21 May 2012, he was appointed minister of interior in the Dmitry Medvedev's Cabinet. He replaced Rashid Nurgaliyev in the post.

In April 2018, the United States imposed sanctions on him and 23 other Russian nationals.

On 15 January 2020, he resigned as part of the cabinet, after President Vladimir Putin delivered the Presidential Address to the Federal Assembly, in which he proposed several amendments to the constitution. He was reinstated  on 21 January 2020.

Personal life
Kolokoltsev is married and has a son and a daughter.

He has a Doktor Nauk (Doctor of Sciences) of Law, and has the rank of "Honoured Officer of Internal Affairs Authorities". He has been decorated with a number of state and departmental awards.

External links 
 Short biography
 Official Biography in MVD Official Website

References

External links

|-

1961 births
Commissioners of the Moscow City Police
Interior ministers of Russia
Living people
Recipients of the Order of Honour (Russia)
Russian municipal police chiefs
21st-century Russian politicians
Russian individuals subject to the U.S. Department of the Treasury sanctions
Russian individuals subject to European Union sanctions